11 Camelopardalis is a single star in the northern circumpolar constellation of Camelopardalis, located around 690 light years away from the Sun as determined by parallax. It has the variable star designation BV Camelopardalis; 11 Camelopardalis is the Flamsteed designation. This object is visible to the naked eye as a faint, blue-white hued star with a baseline apparent visual magnitude of +5.22. It forms a double star with 12 Camelopardalis, which is only 3 arcminutes away.

This is a main sequence Be star with a stellar classification of B3 Ve. Samus et al. (2017) classify it as a Be variable, rather than a Gamma Cassiopeiae type, and it ranges from a peak Hipparcos magnitude of 5.10 down to 5.22. The star is spinning with a projected rotational velocity of 95 km/s, but is being viewed from an extreme pole-on position. Hence it is spinning much more rapidly than indicated. Outbursts of hydrogen emission lines have been observed, as well as rapid changes in hydrogen line profiles. It is 25 million years old with around six times the mass of the Sun.

References

Be stars
B-type main-sequence stars
Gamma Cassiopeiae variable stars
Camelopardalis, BV
Double stars
Camelopardalis (constellation)
Camelopardalis, 11
Durchmusterung objects
032343
023734
1622